The Russian Ground Forces, also known as the Russian Army, are the land forces of the Russian Armed Forces.

The primary responsibilities of the Russian Ground Forces are the protection of the state borders, combat on land, and the defeat of enemy troops.
The President of Russia is the Supreme Commander-in-Chief of the Armed Forces of the Russian Federation. The Commander-in-Chief of the Russian Ground Forces is the chief commanding authority of the Russian Ground Forces. He is appointed by the President of Russia. The Main Command of the Ground Forces is based in Moscow.

Mission 

The primary responsibilities of the Russian Ground Forces are the protection of the state borders, combat on land, the security of occupied territories, and the defeat of enemy troops. The Ground Forces must be able to achieve these goals both in nuclear war and non-nuclear war, especially without the use of weapons of mass destruction. Furthermore, they must be capable of protecting the national interests of Russia within the framework of its international obligations.

The Main Command of the Ground Forces is officially tasked with the following objectives:
 the training of troops for combat, on the basis of tasks determined by the Armed Forces' General Staff
 the improvement of troops' structure and composition, and the optimization of their numbers, including for special troops
 the development of military theory and practice
 the development and introduction of training field manuals, tactics, and methodology
 the improvement of operational and combat training of the Ground Forces

History 

As the Soviet Union dissolved, efforts were made to keep the Soviet Armed Forces as a single military structure for the new Commonwealth of Independent States. The last Minister of Defence of the Soviet Union, Marshal Yevgeny Shaposhnikov, was appointed supreme commander of the CIS Armed Forces in December 1991. Among the numerous treaties signed by the former republics, in order to direct the transition period, was a temporary agreement on general purpose forces, signed in Minsk on 14 February 1992. However, once it became clear that Ukraine (and potentially the other republics) was determined to undermine the concept of joint general purpose forces and form their own armed forces, the new Russian government moved to form its own armed forces.

Russian President Boris Yeltsin signed a decree forming the Russian Ministry of Defence on 7 May 1992, establishing the Russian Ground Forces along with the other branches of the military. At the same time, the General Staff was in the process of withdrawing tens of thousands of personnel from the Group of Soviet Forces in Germany, the Northern Group of Forces in Poland, the Central Group of Forces in Czechoslovakia, the Southern Group of Forces in Hungary, and from Mongolia.

Thirty-seven Soviet Ground Forces divisions had to be withdrawn from the four groups of forces and the Baltic States, and four military districts—totalling 57 divisions—were handed over to Belarus and Ukraine. Some idea of the scale of the withdrawal can be gained from the division list. For the dissolving Soviet Ground Forces, the withdrawal from the former Warsaw Pact states and the Baltic states was an extremely demanding, expensive, and debilitating process.

As the military districts that remained in Russia after the collapse of the Union consisted mostly of the mobile cadre formations, the Ground Forces were, to a large extent, created by relocating the formerly full-strength formations from Eastern Europe to under-resourced districts. However, the facilities in those districts were inadequate to house the flood of personnel and equipment returning from abroad, and many units "were unloaded from the rail wagons into empty fields."
The need for destruction and transfer of large amounts of weaponry under the Treaty on Conventional Armed Forces in Europe also necessitated great adjustments.

Post-Soviet reform plans 
The Ministry of Defence newspaper Krasnaya Zvezda published a reform plan on 21 July 1992. Later one commentator said it was "hastily" put together by the General Staff "to satisfy the public demand for radical changes." The General Staff, from that point, became a bastion of conservatism, causing a build-up of troubles that later became critical. The reform plan advocated a change from an Army-Division-Regiment structure to a Corps-Brigade arrangement. The new structures were to be more capable in a situation with no front line, and more capable of independent action at all levels.

Cutting out a level of command, omitting two out of three higher echelons between the theatre headquarters and the fighting battalions, would produce economies, increase flexibility, and simplify command-and-control arrangements. The expected changeover to the new structure proved to be rare, irregular, and sometimes reversed. The new brigades that appeared were mostly divisions that had broken down until they happened to be at the proposed brigade strengths. New divisions—such as the new 3rd Motor Rifle Division in the Moscow Military District, formed on the basis of disbanding tank formations—were formed, rather than new brigades.

Few of the reforms planned in the early 1990s eventuated, for three reasons: Firstly, there was an absence of firm civilian political guidance, with President Yeltsin primarily interested in ensuring that the Armed Forces were controllable and loyal, rather than reformed. Secondly, declining funding worsened the progress. Finally, there was no firm consensus within the military about what reforms should be implemented. General Pavel Grachev, the first Russian Minister of Defence (1992–96), broadly advertised reforms, yet wished to preserve the old Soviet-style Army, with large numbers of low-strength formations and continued mass conscription. The General Staff and the armed services tried to preserve Soviet-era doctrines, deployments, weapons, and missions in the absence of solid new guidance.

British military expert Michael Orr claims that the hierarchy had great difficulty in fully understanding the changed situation, due to their education. As graduates of Soviet military academies, they received great operational and staff training, but in political terms they had learned an ideology, rather than a wide understanding of international affairs. Thus, the generals—focused on NATO expansion in Eastern Europe—could not adapt themselves and the Armed Forces to the new opportunities and challenges they faced.

Crime and corruption in the ground forces 
The new Russian Ground Forces inherited an increasing crime problem from their Soviet predecessors. As draft resistance grew in the last years of the Soviet Union, the authorities tried to compensate by enlisting men with criminal records and who spoke little or no Russian. Crime rates soared, with the military procurator in Moscow in September 1990 reporting a 40-percent increase in crime over the previous six months, including a 41-percent rise in serious bodily injuries. Disappearances of weapons rose to rampant levels, especially in Eastern Europe and the Caucasus.
	
Generals directing the withdrawals from Eastern Europe diverted arms, equipment, and foreign monies intended to build housing in Russia for the withdrawn troops. Several years later, the former commander in Germany, General Matvei Burlakov, and the Defence Minister, Pavel Grachev, had their involvement exposed. They were also accused of ordering the murder of reporter Dmitry Kholodov, who had been investigating the scandals. In December 1996, Defence Minister Igor Rodionov ordered the dismissal of the Commander of the Ground Forces, General Vladimir Semyonov, for activities incompatible with his position — reportedly his wife's business activities.
	
A 1995 study by the U.S. Foreign Military Studies Office went as far as to say that the Armed Forces were "an institution increasingly defined by the high levels of military criminality and corruption embedded within it at every level." The FMSO noted that crime levels had always grown with social turbulence, such as the trauma Russia was passing through. The author identified four major types among the raft of criminality prevalent within the forces—weapons trafficking and the arms trade; business and commercial ventures; military crime beyond Russia's borders; and contract murder. Weapons disappearances began during the dissolution of the Union and has continued. Within units "rations are sold while soldiers grow hungry ... [while] fuel, spare parts, and equipment can be bought." Meanwhile, voyemkomats take bribes to arrange avoidance of service, or a more comfortable posting.
	
Beyond the Russian frontier, drugs were smuggled across the Tajik border—supposedly being patrolled by Russian guards—by military aircraft, and a Russian senior officer, General Major Alexander Perelyakin, had been dismissed from his post with the United Nations peacekeeping force in Bosnia-Hercegovina (UNPROFOR), following continued complaints of smuggling, profiteering, and corruption. In terms of contract killings, beyond the Kholodov case, there have been widespread rumours that GRU Spetsnaz personnel have been moonlighting as mafiya hitmen.

Reports such as these continued. Some of the more egregious examples have included a constant-readiness motor rifle regiment's tanks running out of fuel on the firing ranges, due to the diversion of their fuel supplies to local businesses. Visiting the 20th Army in April 2002, Sergey Ivanov said the volume of theft was "simply impermissible". Ivanov said year that 20,000 servicemen were wounded or injured in 2002 as a result of accidents or criminal activity across the entire armed forces - so the ground forces figure would be less.

Abuse of personnel, sending soldiers to work outside units—a long-standing tradition which could see conscripts doing things ranging from being large scale manpower supply for commercial businesses to being officers' families' servants—is now banned by Sergei Ivanov's Order 428 of October 2005. What is more, the order is being enforced, with several prosecutions recorded. President Putin also demanded a halt to dishonest use of military property in November 2005: "We must completely eliminate the use of the Armed Forces' material base for any commercial objectives."
	
The spectrum of dishonest activity has included, in the past, exporting aircraft as scrap metal; but the point at which officers are prosecuted has shifted, and investigations over trading in travel warrants and junior officers' routine thieving of soldiers' meals are beginning to be reported. However, British military analysts comment that "there should be little doubt that the overall impact of theft and fraud is much greater than that which is actually detected". Chief Military Prosecutor Sergey Fridinskiy said in March 2007 that there was "no systematic work in the Armed Forces to prevent embezzlement".
	
In March 2011, Military Prosecutor General Sergei Fridinsky reported that crimes had been increasing steadily in the Russian ground forces for the past 18 months, with 500 crimes reported in the period of January to March 2011 alone. Twenty servicemen were crippled and two killed in the same period as a result. Crime in the ground forces was up 16% in 2010 as compared to 2009, with crimes against other servicemen constituting one in every four cases reported.

Compounding this problem was also a rise in "extremist" crimes in the ground forces, with "servicemen from different ethnic groups or regions trying to enforce their own rules and order in their units", according to the Prosecutor General. Fridinsky also lambasted the military investigations department for their alleged lack of efficiency in investigative matters, with only one in six criminal cases being revealed. Military commanders were also accused of concealing crimes committed against servicemen from military officials.
	
A major corruption scandal also occurred at the elite Lipetsk pilot training center, where the deputy commander, the chief of staff and other officers allegedly extorted 3 million roubles of premium pay from other officers since the beginning of 2010. The Tambov military garrison prosecutor confirmed that charges have been lodged against those involved. The affair came to light after a junior officer wrote about the extortion in his personal blog. Sergey Fridinskiy, the Main Military Prosecutor acknowledged that extortion in the distribution of supplementary pay in army units is common, and that "criminal cases on the facts of extortion are being investigated in practically every district and fleet.”

In August 2012, Prosecutor General Fridinsky again reported a rise in crime, with murders rising more than half, bribery cases doubling, and drug trafficking rising by 25% in the first six months of 2012 as compared to the same period in the previous year. Following the release of these statistics, the Union of the Committees of Soldiers' Mothers of Russia denounced the conditions in the Russian army as a "crime against humanity".

In July 2013, the Prosecutor General of Russia's office revealed that corruption in the same year had grown 5.5 times as compared to the previous year, costing the Russian government 4.4 billion rubles (US$130 million). It was also revealed that total number of registered crimes in the Russian armed forces had declined in the same period, although one in five crimes registered were corruption-related.

"In 2019, Chief Military Prosecutor Valery Petrov reported that some $110 million had been lost due to corruption in the military departments and the number was on the uptick."

Internal crisis of 1993 

The Russian Ground Forces reluctantly became involved in the Russian constitutional crisis of 1993 after President Yeltsin issued an unconstitutional decree dissolving the Russian Parliament, following its resistance to Yeltsin's consolidation of power and his neo-liberal reforms. A group of deputies, including Vice President Alexander Rutskoi, barricaded themselves inside the parliament building. While giving public support to the President, the Armed Forces, led by General Grachev, tried to remain neutral, following the wishes of the officer corps. The military leadership were unsure of both the rightness of Yeltsin's cause and the reliability of their forces, and had to be convinced at length by Yeltsin to attack the parliament.

When the attack was finally mounted, forces from five different divisions around Moscow were used, and the personnel involved were mostly officers and senior non-commissioned officers. There were also indications that some formations deployed into Moscow only under protest. However, once the parliament building had been stormed, the parliamentary leaders arrested, and temporary censorship imposed, Yeltsin succeeded in retaining power.

Chechen Wars

First Chechen War 

With the dissolution of the Soviet Union, the Chechens declared independence in November 1991, under the leadership of a former Air Forces officer, General Dzhokar Dudayev. The continuation of Chechen independence was seen as reducing Moscow's authority; Chechnya became perceived as a haven for criminals, and a hard-line group within the Kremlin began advocating war. A Security Council meeting was held 29 November 1994, where Yeltsin ordered the Chechens to disarm, or else Moscow would restore order. Defense Minister Pavel Grachev assured Yeltsin that he would "take Grozny with one airborne assault regiment in two hours."

The operation began on 11 December 1994 and, by 31 December, Russian forces were entering Grozny, the Chechen capital. The 131st Motor Rifle Brigade was ordered to make a swift push for the centre of the city, but was then virtually destroyed in Chechen ambushes. After finally seizing Grozny amid fierce resistance, Russian troops moved on to other Chechen strongholds. When Chechen militants took hostages in the Budyonnovsk hospital hostage crisis in Stavropol Kray in June 1995, peace looked possible for a time, but the fighting continued. Following this incident, the separatists were referred to as insurgents or terrorists within Russia.

Dzhokar Dudayev was assassinated in a Russian airstrike on 21 April 1996, and that summer, a Chechen attack retook Grozny. Alexander Lebed, then Secretary of the Security Council, began talks with the Chechen rebel leader Aslan Maskhadov in August 1996 and signed an agreement on 22/23 August; by the end of that month, the fighting ended.
The formal ceasefire was signed in the Dagestani town of Khasavyurt on 31 August 1996, stipulating that a formal agreement on relations between the Chechen Republic of Ichkeria and the Russian federal government need not be signed until late 2001.

Writing some years later, Dmitri Trenin and Aleksei Malashenko described the Russian military's performance in Chechniya as "grossly deficient at all levels, from commander-in-chief to the drafted private." The Ground Forces' performance in the First Chechen War has been assessed by a British academic as "appallingly bad".
Writing six years later, Michael Orr said "one of the root causes of the Russian failure in 1994–96 was their inability to raise and deploy a properly trained military force."

Second Chechen War 

The Second Chechen War began in August 1999 after Chechen militias invaded neighboring Dagestan, followed quickly in early September by a series of four terrorist bombings across Russia. This prompted Russian military action against the alleged Chechen culprits.

In the first Chechen war, the Russians primarily laid waste to an area with artillery and airstrikes before advancing the land forces. Improvements were made in the Ground Forces between 1996 and 1999; when the Second Chechen War started, instead of hastily assembled "composite regiments" dispatched with little or no training, whose members had never seen service together, formations were brought up to strength with replacements, put through preparatory training, and then dispatched. Combat performance improved accordingly, and large-scale opposition was crippled.

Most of the prominent past Chechen separatist leaders had died or been killed, including former President Aslan Maskhadov and leading warlord and terrorist attack mastermind Shamil Basayev. However, small-scale conflict continued to drag on; as of November 2007, it had spread across other parts of the Russian Caucasus. It was a divisive struggle, with at least one senior military officer dismissed for being unresponsive to government commands: General Colonel Gennady Troshev was dismissed in 2002 for refusing to move from command of the North Caucasus Military District to command of the less important Siberian Military District.

The Second Chechen War was officially declared ended on 16 April 2009.

Reforms under Sergeyev 
When Igor Sergeyev arrived as Minister of Defence in 1997, he initiated what were seen as real reforms under very difficult conditions.
The number of military educational establishments, virtually unchanged since 1991, was reduced, and the amalgamation of the Siberian and Trans-Baikal Military Districts was ordered. A larger number of army divisions were given "constant readiness" status, which was supposed to bring them up to 80 percent manning and 100 percent equipment holdings. Sergeyev announced in August 1998 that there would be six divisions and four brigades on 24-hour alert by the end of that year. Three levels of forces were announced; constant readiness, low-level, and strategic reserves.

However, personnel quality—even in these favored units—continued to be a problem. Lack of fuel for training and a shortage of well-trained junior officers hampered combat effectiveness. However, concentrating on the interests of his old service, the Strategic Rocket Forces, Sergeyev directed the disbanding of the Ground Forces headquarters itself in December 1997. The disbandment was a "military nonsense", in Orr's words, "justifiable only in terms of internal politics within the Ministry of Defence". The Ground Forces' prestige declined as a result, as the headquarters disbandment implied—at least in theory—that the Ground Forces no longer ranked equally with the Air Force and Navy.

Reforms under Putin 

Under President Vladimir Putin, more funds were committed, the Ground Forces Headquarters was reestablished, and some progress on professionalisation occurred. Plans called for reducing mandatory service to 18 months in 2007, and to one year by 2008, but a mixed Ground Force, of both contract soldiers and conscripts, would remain. (As of 2009, the length of conscript service was 12 months.)

Funding increases began in 1999; after some recovery in the Russian economy and the associated rise in income, especially from oil, "Russia's officially reported defence spending [rose] in nominal terms at least, for the first time since the formation of the Russian Federation". The budget rose from 141 billion rubles in 2000 to 219 billion rubles in 2001. Much of this funding has been spent on personnel—there have been several pay rises, starting with a 20-percent rise authorised in 2001. The current professionalisation programme, including 26,000 extra sergeants, was expected to cost at least 31 billion roubles ($1.1 billion USD). Increased funding has been spread across the whole budget, with personnel spending being matched by greater procurement and research and development funding.

However, in 2004, Alexander Goltz said that, given the insistence of the hierarchy on trying to force contract soldiers into the old conscript pattern, there is little hope of a fundamental strengthening of the Ground Forces. He further elaborated that they are expected to remain, to some extent, a military liability and "Russia's most urgent social problem" for some time to come. Goltz summed up by saying: "All of this means that the Russian armed forces are not ready to defend the country and that, at the same time, they are also dangerous for Russia. Top military personnel demonstrate neither the will nor the ability to effect fundamental changes."

More money is arriving both for personnel and equipment; Russian Prime Minister Vladimir Putin stated in June 2008 that monetary allowances for servicemen in permanent-readiness units will be raised significantly. In May 2007, it was announced that enlisted pay would rise to 65,000 roubles (US$2,750) per month, and the pay of officers on combat duty in rapid response units would rise to 100,000–150,000 roubles (US$4,230–$6,355) per month. However, while the move to one year conscript service would disrupt dedovshchina, it is unlikely that bullying will disappear altogether without significant societal change. Other assessments from the same source point out that the Russian Armed Forces faced major disruption in 2008, as demographic change hindered plans to reduce the term of conscription from two years to one.

Serdyukov reforms 

A major reorganisation of the force began in 2007 by the Minister for Defence Anatoliy Serdyukov, with the aim of converting all divisions into brigades, and cutting surplus officers and establishments. In the course of the reorganization, the 4-chain command structure (military district – field army – division – regiment) that was used until then was replaced with a 3-chain structure: strategic command – operational command – brigade. Brigades are supposed to be used as mobile permanent-readiness units capable of fighting independently with the support of highly mobile task forces or together with other brigades under joint command.

In a statement on 4 September 2009, RGF Commander-in-Chief Vladimir Boldyrev said that half of the Russian land forces were reformed by 1 June and that 85 brigades of constant combat preparedness had already been created. Among them are the combined-arms brigade, missile brigades, assault brigades and electronic warfare brigades.

During General Mark Hertling's term as Commander, United States Army Europe in 2011-2012, he visited Russia at the invitation of the Commander of the Ground Forces, "Colonel-General (corresponding to an American lieutenant general) Aleksandr Streitsov ..at preliminary meetings" with the Embassy of the United States, Moscow, the U.S. Defence Attache told Hertling that the Ground Forces "while still substantive in quantity, continued to decline in capability and quality. My subsequent visits to the schools and units [Colonel General] Streitsov chose reinforced these conclusions. The classroom discussions were sophomoric, and the units in training were going through the motions of their scripts with no true training value or combined arms interaction—infantry, armor, artillery, air, and resupply all trained separately."

Reforms under Sergey Shoygu 

After Sergey Shoygu took over the role of minister of defense, the reforms Serdyukov had implemented were reversed. He also aimed to restore trust with senior officers as well as the defense ministry in the wake of the intense resentment Serduykov's reforms had generated. He did this a number of ways but one of the ways was integrating himself by wearing a military uniform.

Shoygu ordered 750 military exercises, such as Vostok 2018. The exercises also seemed to have helped validate the general direction of reform. The effect of this readiness was seen during Russia's annexation of Crimea in 2014. Since Anatoliy Serdyukov had already completed the unpopular reforms (military downsizing and reorganization), it was relatively easy for Shoygu to be conciliatory with the officer corps and Ministry of Defense.

Rearmament has been an important goal of reform. With the goal of 70% modernization by 2020. This was one of the main goals of these reforms. From 1998 to 2001, the Russian Army received almost no new equipment. Sergey Shoygu took a less confrontational approach with the defense industry. By showing better flexibility on terms and pricing, the awarding of new contracts for the upcoming period was much better. Shoygu promised that future contracts would be awarded primarily to domestic firms. While easing tensions, these concessions also weakened incentives for companies to improve performance.

Shoygu also focused on forming battalion tactical groups (BTGs) as the permanent readiness component of the Russian army, rather than brigade-sized formations. According to sources quoted by the Russian Interfax agency, this was due to a lack of the manpower needed for permanent-readiness brigades. BTGs made up the preponderance of units deployed by Russia in the Donbass war. By August 2021 Shoygu claimed that the Russian army had around 170 BTGs.

Russo-Ukrainian War
Russia conducted a military buildup on the Ukrainian border starting in late 2021. By mid February 2022, elements of the 29th, 35th and 36th Combined Arms Armies (CAAs) were deployed to Belarus, supported by additional S-400 systems, a squadron of Su-25 and a squadron of Su-35; additional S-400 systems and four Su-30 fighters were deployed to the country for joint use with Belarus. Russia also had the 20th and 8th CAAs and the 22nd AC regularly deployed near the Ukrainian border, while elements of 41st CAA were deployed to Yelnya, elements of 1st TA and 6th CAA were deployed to Voronezh and elements of the 49th and the 58th CAA were deployed to Crimea. In all, Russia deployed some 150,000 soldiers around Ukraine during this time, in preparation for the eventual Russian invasion.

On 11 February, the US and western nations communicated that Putin had decided to invade Ukraine, and on 12 February, the US and Russian embassies in Kyiv started to evacuate personnel. On February 24, Russian troops began invading Ukraine.

During the 2022 Russian invasion of Ukraine, Russian tank losses were reported by the use of Ukrainian sophisticated anti-tank weapons and a lack of air support the Russian army has been described by Phillips O'Brien, a professor of strategic studies at St Andrews University as “a boxer who has a great right hook and a glass jaw.” Quoting Napoleon “In war, moral power is to physical as three parts out of four.” Retired US four-star general Curtis Scaparrotti has blamed confusion and poor morale amongst Russian soldiers over their mission as to their poor performance.

Reports say that Russian forces are having to repair damaged Ukrainian tanks; the Russian Defence Ministry says these tanks are for pro-Russian forces. The Ukrainian Defence Ministry's Chief Directorate of Intelligence claims that Russia has stopped making new tanks. Due to the fighting in Ukraine the Russian Victory Day parade will be reduced by some 35%, purely in ground combat vehicles or systems. The parade on 9 May 2022, according to the official guide, would feature only 25 Russian combat systems and 131 ground combat vehicles. Compared to last year where it featured 198 vehicles and 35 combat systems. In particular there is a shortage of display ready T-80 and they are using older equipment to make up numbers. An example is usage of tank transporters in lieu of actual tanks. As of 6 May, at least 12 generals have been killed in Ukraine, according to the Ukrainian Ministry of Defense. This "suggests that the generals need to be at the front lines to ensure that their troops are conducting the battle plan in the way that they want. But that also suggests a lack of confidence in their troops if they need to be that far forward with that many senior folks." Ukraine further claims that some 317 officers have been killed, a third of whom are senior command staff. In a tweet the UK MoD said that the Russian officer corps was suffering "devastating losses" particularly in the junior to mid officer ranks. United States officials estimated that Russian forces had lost 150,000+ killed and wounded from 24 February 2022 – 21 January 2023. In stark contrast, the Russian Defence Minister said that only 5,937 personnel from the entire Russian Armed Forces had been killed from 24 February – 21 September 2022, the first seven months of fighting. Reported figures from Donetsk and Luhansk would add some 22,000 to this figure.

On 14 February 2023, British defense secretary Ben Wallace told the BBC that 97% of the Russian ground forces were now committed to the war in Ukraine.

Structure 
The President of Russia is the Supreme Commander-in-Chief of the Armed Forces of the Russian Federation. The Main Command (Glavkomat) of the Ground Forces, based in Moscow, directs activities. This body was disbanded in 1997, but reformed by President Putin in 2001 by appointing Colonel General Nikolai Kormiltsev as the commander-in-chief of the ground forces and also as a deputy minister of defense.

Kormiltsev handed over command to Colonel General (later General of the Army) Alexey Maslov in 2004, and in a realignment of responsibilities, the Ground Forces Commander-in-Chief lost his position as a deputy minister of defence. Like Kormiltsev, while serving as Ground Forces Commander-in-Chief Maslov has been promoted to General of the Army.

In January 2014, the acting commander of the Russian Ground Forces was Lieutenant General Sergei Istrakov, who was appointed by Russian president Vladimir Putin upon the dismissal of former commander Colonel General Vladimir Chirkin over corruption charges in December 2013. Istrakov handed over his position to a new commander on 2 May 2014, Colonel General Oleg Salyukov.

The Main Command of the Ground Forces consists of the Main Staff of the Ground Troops, and departments for Peacekeeping Forces, Armaments of the Ground Troops, Rear Services of the Ground Troops, Cadres of the Ground Troops (personnel), Indoctrination Work, and Military Education. There were also a number of directorates which used to be commanded by the Ground Forces Commander-in-Chief in his capacity as a deputy defence minister. They included NBC Protection Troops of the Armed Forces, Engineer Troops of the Armed Forces, and Troop Air Defence, as well as several others. Their exact command status is now unknown.

Branches of service 

The branches of service include motorized rifles, tanks, artillery and rocket forces, troop air defense, special corps (reconnaissance, signals, radio electronic warfare, engineering, nuclear, biological and chemical protection, logistical support, automobile, and the protection of the rear), special forces, military units, and logistical establishments.

The Motorised Rifle Troops, the most numerous branch of service, constitutes the nucleus of Ground Forces' battle formations. They are equipped with powerful armament for destruction of ground-based and aerial targets, missile complexes, tanks, artillery and mortars, anti-tank guided missiles, anti-aircraft missile systems and installations, and means of reconnaissance and control. It is estimated that there were 16 motor rifle divisions and 12 motor rifle brigades before the "new look" reforms With the reform, these motor rifle units were converted into 35 motor rifle brigades. With the replacement of Anatoly Serdyukov with Sergei Shoigu as Minister of Defense, some of the disbanded divisions were reformed from already existing brigades, while others, like the 144th Guards Motor Rifle Division were reformed from scratch. Some units, like the 80th Arctic Motor Rifle Brigade, are trained especially for a specific environment. As of 2022, there were 9 motor rifle divisions, 22 motor rifle brigades and one independent motor rifle regiment, the 7th Independent Guards "Proletarian Moscow-Minsk" Motor Rifle Regiment in the Kaliningrad Oblast.

The Navy also has several motor rifle formations under its command in the Ground and Coastal Defence Forces of the Baltic Fleet, the Northeastern Group of Troops and Forces on the Kamchatka Peninsula and other areas of the extreme northeast, apart from traditional naval infantry units. The best-known of these formations is the 126th Coastal Defence Brigade. Also present are a large number of mobilisation divisions and brigades, known as "Bases for Storage of Weapons and Equipment", that in peacetime only have enough personnel assigned to guard the site and maintain the weapons.

The Tank Troops are the main impact force of the Ground Forces and a powerful mean of armed struggle, intended for the accomplishment of the most important combat tasks. In 2007, there were three tank divisions in the force: the 4th Guards "Kantemirovskaya" and 10th Guards "Uralsko-Lvovskaya" within the Moscow Military District, and the 5th Guards "Don" in the Siberian MD.
The 2nd Guards "Tatsinkaya" Tank Division in the Siberian Military District and the 21st Tank Division in the Far Eastern MD were disbanded in the early 2000s, although the first one is still represented in the ground forces though the 5th Separate Guards "Tatsinkaya" Tank Brigade. Like motor rifle divisions, all tank divisions were transformed into brigades following the 2008 reforms, although the 4th Guards Tank Division was reformed in 2013, with two new tank divisions, the 90th Guards and the 47th Guards being created from pre-existing brigades in 2016 and 2022, respectively. The 10th Guards Tank Division is still represented in the ground forces though the 1st Separate Uralsko-Lvovskaya Tank Brigade. As of 2022, there were 3 tank divisions and 2 tank brigades.

The Artillery and Rocket Forces provide the Ground Forces' main firepower. The Ground Forces previously included six static defence machine-gun/artillery and field artillery divisions. The only remaining unit of this type is the 18th Machine Gun Artillery Division The previous 34th Guards in the Moscow MD, 12th in the Siberian MD, and the 15th in the Far Eastern MD, seem to have disbanded. The 127th Machine Gun Artillery Division was transformed into a motor rifle unit following the Serdyukov reforms. As of 2022, there were 1 machine gun artillery divisions and 17 artillery brigades.

The Air Defense Troops (PVO) are one of the basic weapons for the destruction of enemy air forces. They consist of surface-to-air missiles, anti-aircraft artillery and radio-technical units and subdivisions.

Army Aviation, while intended for the direct support of the Ground Forces, has been under the control of the Air Forces (VVS) since 2003. However, it was planned that by 2015, Army Aviation will have been transferred back to the Ground Forces and 18 new aviation brigades will have been added. Of the around 1,000 new helicopters that have been ordered under the State Armament Programmes, 900 will be for the Army Aviation. This transfer did not take place.

The Spetsnaz GRU serve under the Ground Forces in peacetime and at the same time are directly subordinated to the Main Directorate of Intelligence (GRU) and will fall under GRU operational control during wartime operations or under special circumstances. The Ground Forces currently fields 7 spetsnaz brigades of varying sizes and one spetsnaz regiment.

Dispositions since 2021 
As a result of the 2008 Russian military reforms, the ground forces now consist of armies subordinate to the four new military districts: Western, Southern, Central, and Eastern Military Districts. The new districts have the role of 'operational strategic commands,' which command the Ground Forces as well as the Naval Forces and part of the Air and Air Defence Forces within their areas of responsibility.

Each major formation is bolded, and directs the non-bolded major subordinate formations. It is not entirely clear to which superior(s) the four operational-strategic commands will report from 1 December 2010, as they command formations from multiple services (Air Force, Ground Forces & Navy). A current detailed list of the subordinate units of the four military districts can be found in the respective articles. During 2009, all 23 remaining divisions were reorganised into four tank brigades, 35 motor-rifle brigades, one prikritiya brigade formed from a machinegun-light artillery division, and three airborne-assault brigades (pre-existing). Almost all are now designated otdelnaya (separate), with only several brigades retaining the guards honorific title.

In 2013, two of these brigades were reactivated as full divisions: the 2nd Guards Tamanskaya Motor Rifle Division and 4th Guards Kantemirovskaya Tank Division. These two divisions marked the beginning of the expansion of the Ground Forces as more brigades are being reformed into full divisions within each military district.

Since 1 January 2021, the Northern Fleet has been elevated into the Northern Fleet Joint Strategic Command. However, 
in December 2022 it was announced that the Moscow and Leningrad Military Districts were to be reformed. It is thus likely that the Northern Fleet will be relieved of land forces command responsibilities.

Personnel 

In 2006, the Ground Forces included an estimated total of 360,000 persons, including approximately 190,000 conscripts. The IISS counted both the Ground Forces and the Russian Airborne Forces together, which produced a figure of 395,000. This can be compared to an estimated 670,000, with 210,000 conscripts, in 1995–96. These numbers should be treated with caution, however, due to the difficulty for those outside Russia to make accurate assessments, and confusion even within the General Staff on the numbers of conscripts within the force.

The Ground Forces began their existence in 1992, inheriting the Soviet military manpower system practically unchanged, though it was in a state of rapid decay. The Soviet Ground Forces were traditionally manned through terms of conscription, which had been reduced in 1967 from three to two years and in 2008 to a full year, following which those who have served their mandatory service may sign contracts to become professional servicemen. This system was administered through the thousands of military commissariats (voyenkomat) located throughout the Soviet Union. Between January and May of each year, every young Soviet male citizen was required to report to the local voyenkomat for assessment for military service, following a summons based on lists from every school and employer in the area.

The voyenkomat worked to quotas sent out by a department of the General Staff, listing how many young men were required by each service and branch of the Armed Forces. Since the fall of the Soviet Union, draft evasion has skyrocketed - officials regularly bemoan the ten or so percent that actually appear when summoned. The new conscripts were then picked up by an officer from their future unit and usually sent by train across the country.

On arrival, they would begin the Young Soldiers' course, and become part of the system of senior rule, known as dedovshchina, literally "rule by the grandfathers." There were only a very small number of professional non-commissioned officers (NCOs), as most NCOs were conscripts sent on short courses to prepare them for section commanders' and platoon sergeants' positions. These conscript NCOs were supplemented by praporshchik warrant officers, positions created in the 1960s to support the increased variety of skills required for modern weapons.

The Soviet Army's officer-to-soldier ratio was extremely top-heavy, partially in order to compensate for the relatively low education level of the military manpower base and the absence of professional NCOs. Following World War II and the great expansion of officer education, officers became the product of four-to-five-year higher military colleges. As in most armies, newly commissioned officers usually become platoon leaders, having to accept responsibility for the soldiers' welfare and training (with the exceptions noted above).

Young officers in Soviet Army units were worked round the clock, normally receiving only three days off per month. Annual vacations were under threat if deficiencies emerged within the unit, and the pressure created enormous stress. Towards the end of the Soviet Union, this led to a decline in morale amongst young officers.

In the early 2000s, many junior officers did not wish to serve—in 2002, more than half the officers who left the forces did so early. Their morale was low, among other reasons because their postings were entirely in the hands of their immediate superiors and the personnel department."

There is little available information on the current status of women, who are not conscripted, in the Russian Ground Forces. According to the BBC, there were 90,000 women in the Russian Army in 2002, though estimates on numbers of women across the entire Russian Armed Forces in 2000 ranged from 115,000 to 160,000. Women serve in support roles, most commonly in the fields of nursing, communications, and engineering. Some officers' wives have become contract service personnel.

From small beginnings in the early 1990s, employment of contract soldiers (kontraktniki) has grown greatly within the Ground Forces, though many have been of poor quality (wives of officers with no other prospective employment, for example). In December 2005, Sergei Ivanov, then Minister of Defence, proposed that—in addition to the numerous enlisted contract soldiers—all sergeants should become professional, which would raise the number of professional soldiers and non-commissioned officers in the Armed Forces overall to approximately 140,000 in 2008. The current programme allows for an extra 26,000 posts for fully professional sergeants.
	
	
The CIA reported in the World Factbook that 30 percent of Russian army personnel were contract servicemen at the end of 2005, and that, as of May 2006, 178,000 contract servicemen were serving in the Ground Forces and the Navy. Planning calls for volunteer servicemen to compose 70 percent of armed forces by 2010, with the remaining servicemen consisting of conscripts. At the end of 2005, the Ground Forces had 40 all-volunteer constant readiness units, with another 20 constant readiness units to be formed in 2006. These CIA figures can be set against IISS data, which reports that at the end of 2004, the number of contracts being signed in the Moscow Military District was only 17 percent of the target figure; in the North Caucasus, 45 percent; and in the Volga-Ural, 25 percent.
	
	
Whatever the number of contract soldiers, commentators such as Alexander Goltz are pessimistic that many more combat ready units will result, as senior officers "see no difference between professional NCOs, ... versus conscripts who have been drilled in training schools for less than six months. Such sergeants will have neither the knowledge nor the experience that can help them win authority [in] the barracks." Defence Minister Sergey Ivanov underlined the in-barracks discipline situation, even after years of attempted professionalisation, when releasing the official injury figures for 2002. 531 men had died on duty as a result of accidents and crimes, and 20,000 had been wounded (the numbers apparently not including suicides). According to Ivanov, "the accident rate is not falling". Two of every seven conscripts will become addicted to drugs and alcohol while serving their terms, and a further one in twenty will suffer homosexual rape, according to 2005 reports.
	
	
Part of the reason is the feeling between contract servicemen, conscripts, and officers. 

The Russian army is to replenished by 400,000 contract servicemen, starting 1 April 2023.

Equipment 

The Russian Ground Forces retain a very large quantity of vehicles and equipment. There is also likely to be a great deal of older equipment in state military storage, a practice continued from the Soviet Union. However, following the collapse of the USSR, the newly independent republics became host to most of the formations with modern equipment, whereas Russia was left with lower-category units, usually with older equipment. As financial stringency began to bite harder, the amount of new equipment fell as well, and by 1998, only ten tanks and about 30 BMP infantry fighting vehicles were being purchased each year.

New equipment, like the Armata Universal Combat Platform, Bumerang, and Kurganets-25, has been introduced since 2015, and has begun replacing old tanks and armored vehicles such as the BMPs, BTRs like the T-72, T-90, BMP-1/2/3, and BTR-80s that have been in active service. Funding for new equipment has greatly risen in recent years.

Two Iskander-M missile system brigade sets, over 60 Tornado-G MLRS and more than 20 Msta-SM self-propelled howitzers have been received in 2016. The Russian Ground Forces received two brigade sets of Buk-M3 and Buk-M2 air defence missile complexes in 2016. Troops also received two division sets of Tor-M2 and two of Tor-M2U air defence missile complexes. Moreover, the Forces received Verba MANPADS, more than 130 BMP-3 IFVs and BTR-82A APCs as well as more than 20 Tigr-M armored vehicles equipped with the Arbalet-DM combat module.

Russian troops have reportedly received 2,930 new or modernized systems allowing for two missile brigades, two SAM brigades and two SAM regiments, one Spetsnaz brigade, 12 motorized rifle and tank battalions, and three artillery divisions to be reequipped.

The share of modern weapons and equipment in the Ground Forces from 2012 to 2020 increased by 4 times. Over eight years, more than 2,500 units of armored weapons have been delivered to tank formations and military units of the Ground Forces, including more than 1,000 upgraded tanks T-72B3, T-72B3M, T-80BVM and T-90M. The motorized rifle troops received more than 1,500 units of infantry fighting vehicles BMP-3, upgraded BMP-2 and armored personnel carriers BTR-82A (AM).

The missile forces and artillery of the Ground Forces from 2012 to 2020 received over 1,500 units of military equipment - operational-tactical missile systems "Iskander-M", multiple launch rocket systems of the "Tornado" family, self-propelled howitzers "Msta-SM".

Air Defense Troops of the Ground Forces received over 900 units of military equipment - long-range anti-aircraft missile systems S-300V4, short-range and medium-range anti-aircraft missile systems "Tor-M2" and "Buk-M3", portable anti-aircraft missile systems "Verba".

 there is a shortage of munitions.

Equipment summary 

Figures listed as "Active" only include equipment that circulated in active service.

Ranks and insignia 

The newly re-emergent Russia retained most of the ranks of the Soviet Army, with some minor changes. The principal difference from the usual Western style is some variation in generals' rank titles—in at least one case, Colonel General, derived from German usage. Most of the modern rank names used in the Russian military were borrowed from existing German/Prussian, French, English, Dutch, and Polish ranks upon the formation of the modern Russian Army in the late 17th century, and have lasted with few changes of title through the Soviet period.

Officers 
The rank insignia of commissioned officers.

Other ranks 
The rank insignia of non-commissioned officers and enlisted personnel.

Commanders

Commander-in-chief (1992–1997) 
 Vladimir Semyonov (1992–1997)

Chief of the Main Directorate (1998–2001) 
 Yury Bukreyev (1998–2001)

Commander-in-chief (2001–present) 
 Nikolai Kormiltsev (2001–2004)
 Aleksei Maslov (2004–2008)
 Vladimir Boldyrev (2008–2010)
 Aleksandr Postnikov-Streltsov (2010–2012)
 Vladimir Chirkin (2012–2013)
 Sergei Istrakov (2013–2014, acting)
 Oleg Salyukov (2014–present)

Ground Forces Day 

On 31 May 2006, President Vladimir Putin signed decree No. 549 "On the establishment of professional holidays and memorable days in the Armed Forces of the Russian Federation", according to which it was ordered to celebrate Ground Forces Day. The date chosen for the holiday commemorates the edict made by Tsar Ivan the Terrible on 1 October 1550 on the placement in Moscow and surrounding districts of a thousand servicemen forming a local brigade of Streltsy, which essentially became a key document in the further formation and development of the Imperial Russian Army.

Ground Forces Day was first celebrated on the Preobrazhenskaya Square in Moscow in the Church of the Transfiguration of the Lord, where a bishop's service was held. Before the start of the service, an order of the Minister of Defense Sergei Shoigu and the decree of Patriarch Kirill of Moscow were read, according to which the Cathedral of the Transfiguration of the Lord officially became the main temple of the RF Ground Forces. A year later, the holiday was celebrated with the adoption of the Ground Forces Anthem.

The following holidays are also celebrated by the Ground Forces: Day of Tankmen, Day of Rocket Forces and Artillery, Day of Air Defense.

See also 

 Naval Infantry (Russia)
 Awards and emblems of the Ministry of Defence of the Russian Federation

References

Bibliography 

 
 
 
 
 
 
 
 
 
 
 
 
 
 
 
 
 
 
 
 
 
 
 
 
 
 
 Scott, Harriet Fast & Scott, William F. Russian Military Directories 2002 & 2004

External links
 

 
Military of Russia

pt:Forças Armadas da Rússia